
Gmina Serniki is a rural gmina (administrative district) in Lubartów County, Lublin Voivodeship, in eastern Poland.

Villages
Gmina Serniki contains the villages and settlements of Brzostówka, Czerniejów, Nowa Wieś, Nowa Wola, Serniki, Serniki-Kolonia, Wola Sernicka, Wola Sernicka-Kolonia, Wólka Zabłocka and Wólka Zawieprzycka.

Neighbouring gminas
Gmina Serniki is bordered by the gminas of Lubartów, Niedźwiada, Ostrów Lubelski and Spiczyn.

References

Polish official population figures 2006

Serniki
Lubartów County